The Agency Seal Medal (formerly Medallion) is awarded by the Central Intelligence Agency to non-Agency personnel, including U.S. Government employees and private citizens, who have made significant contributions to the Agency's intelligence efforts.

Known or indicated recipients 
Since recipients of this award are not all made public, it is not possible to verify with certainty whether a person has, or has not, received this award.  The following individuals list the Agency Seal Medal (or Medallion) in their public biographies and have verifiable backgrounds consistent with that claim.

 Vincent Melzac (1982)
 Robert R. Simmons (1985)
 Mary C. Lawton (1986)
 Victoria Toensing (1986)
 Richards J. Heuer, Jr. (1987)
 William V. Trollinger (1987)
 Dan McKinnon (1989)
 RDML David M. Goebel (1991) (START I)
 Colonel Jesse Johnson (Commander SOCCENT, Gulf War - 1991)
 Jeannie Rousseau (Vicomtesse de Clarens) (1993)
 Gordon J. F. MacDonald (1994)
 Dr. Bruce Hoffman (1994)
 Judge Joyce Hens Green (1995)
 Naval Surface Warfare Center Technical Support Group (1995)
 Lt. General William Quinn (1997)
 L. Britt Snider (1997)
 Veryl Goodnight (2000)
 Siddhi Savetsila (2000), with 4 other Free Thai veterans
 Carl Nick Sudano (2001)
 Joseph Shannon (2001)
 Victor A. DeMarines (2001)
 Stephen A. Cheney (2002)
 Marine Air Control Squadron 2 (2004)
 Lt. Colonel Rick Francona (2006)
 Gilman Louie (2006)
 MSgt David W. Hamlet (2007)
 Senator Pat Roberts (2007)
 U.S. Rep. Jane Harman (2007)
 Frances Fragos Townsend (2007)
 U.S. Rep. Heather Wilson (2008)
 Senator John Warner (2009)
 U.S. Rep. Peter Hoekstra (2010)
 Chad Moore (2012)
 Gerald Hackett (2017)
 Ambassador Harry B. Harris Jr. (2013)

Year of award unknown (listed alphabetically):
 Oswald LeWinter
 Paul W. Butler
 Michael T. Dougherty
 Hal Mooz and Kevin Forsberg
 Senator Wyche Fowler, Jr.
 Maj. General Robert A. Harding
 Col. Stuart A. Herrington
 Gen. Patrick M. Hughes
 Judge Kenneth M. Karas
 Maj. General Jack Leide
 LTG Michael Flynn
 Harriet Miers
 Senator Daniel Patrick Moynihan
 Benjamin A. Powell
 Erik Prince
 David W. Szady
 Mary Jo White
 Joseph Yorio
 Craig Rychlicki

See also 
Awards and decorations of the United States government

References

Awards and decorations of the Central Intelligence Agency
Recipients of the Agency Seal Medal